Ahmadabad (also Romanized as Aḩmadābād; also known as Aḩmadābād-e Rasūlīān) is a village in Rezvan Rural District, Ferdows District, Rafsanjan County, Kerman Province, Iran. At the 2006 census, its population was 158, in 40 families.

References 

Populated places in Rafsanjan County